The 13th Asianet Film Awards honors the best films in 2010 and was held on 9 January 2011 at Willingdon Island in Kochi. The winners were announced on 1 January 2011. The title sponsor of the event is Ujala.

Amitabh Bachchan, who was conferred the Lifetime Achievement Award, was the chief. The event was telecasted on Asianet in two parts – on 29 January and 30 January.

Celebrities 
The biggest attraction of the ceremony was the presence of Bollywood actor Amitabh Bachchan, who was conferred the Lifetime Achievement Award. The laurel came to Amitabh Bachchan from million viewers of Asianet, who had selected the actor for his onscreen aura and special connect that he shares with international fans around the world.
He was accompanied with the host of stars from Malayalam film industry.
The show saw the attendance of celebrities Mammootty, Mohanlal, Jayaram, Dileep, Sreenivasan, Suraj Venjaramoodu, Innocent, Jagathy Sreekumar, Siddique (actor), Siddique (director), Vijay Karthi Lal, Kunchacko Boban, Asif Ali, Jayasurya, Jeethu Joseph, Lal Jose, Major Ravi B Unnikrishnan, Manoj K Jayan, Rahman Narain, Anoop Menon, Nedumudi Venu, MG Sreekumar, Nayanthara Sneha, Ann Augustine, Meera Nandan, Meghana Raj, Mithra Kurian, Archana Kavi, Ananya, Samvrutha Sunil, Mamta Mohandas, Lakshmi Gopalaswami, Kaniha Lakshmi Rai, Amala Paul, Ambika Sarayu, KS Chithra, and many more.

Winners

 Best Film: Pranchiyettan and the Saint
 Best Director: Lal for In Ghost House Inn
 Lifetime Achievement Award: Amitabh Bachchan
 Golden Star Award: Mohanlal
 Best Actor: Mammootty for Pranchiyettan and the Saint, Kutty Srank, Best Actor
 Best Actress: Nayantara for Bodyguard
 Most Popular Actor: Dileep for Bodyguard
 Most Popular Actress: Mamta Mohandas for Kadha Thudarunnu
 Best Character Actor: Innocent for Kadha Thudarunnu
 Best Character Actress: Samvrutha Sunil for Cocktail
 Special Jury Award: Sreenivasan for Athma Kadha
 Best Music Director: M. G. Sreekumar for Oru Naal Varum
 Best Screenplay: Sathyan Anthikkad for Kadha Thudarunnu
 Best Cinematographer: Venu for Kadha Thudarunnu
 Best Editor: Arun Kumar for Cocktail
 Best Music Director: M. G. Sreekumar for Oru Naal Varum
 Best Lyricist: Murukan Kattakada for Oru Naal Varum
 Best Supporting Actor: Nedumudi Venu for Elsamma Enna Ankutty, Best Actor
 Best Supporting Actress: Lakshmipriya for Kadha Thudarunnu
 Best Actor in a Villain Role: Asif Ali for Apoorvaragam
 Best Actor in a Comic Role: Suraj Venjaramoodu for Various films
 Best Star Pair: Kunchacko Boban & Archana Jose Kavi for Mummy & Me
Best Debutant Actress: Ann Augustine for Elsamma Enna Aankutty
 Best Child Artist (Male): Master Alexander for T D Dasan Std VI B
 Best Child Artist (Female): Baby Anikha for Kadha Thudarunnu
 Best Male Playback Singer: Hariharan for "Aaro Padunnu" (Kadha Thudarunnu)
 Best Female Playback Singer: Shreya Ghoshal for "Manjumazhakkalam" (Aagathan)
 Youth Icon of the Year: Jayasurya for Happy Husbands, Cocktail, Nallavan, Four Friends
 Popular Hero Award in Tamil Films: Vijay
 Special Award for Best Film on National Integration: Major Ravi for Kandahar

References

2011 Indian film awards
Asianet Film Awards